Cigliè is a  (municipality) in the Province of Cuneo in the Italian region Piedmont, located about  south of Turin and about  east of Cuneo.

Cigliè borders the following municipalities: Bastia Mondovì, Clavesana, Mondovì, Niella Tanaro, and Rocca Cigliè.

Demographic evolution

References

Cities and towns in Piedmont
Comunità Montana Valli Mongia, Cevetta e Langa Cebana